Floyd Marion Roberts (February 12, 1900 - May 30, 1939) was a Championship Car racing driver from Jamestown, North Dakota. He led for 92 laps. Roberts was the first defending champion of the race to have been killed in competition. According to reports, Roberts intended to retire following the race.

Early years
He was born on February 12, 1900, in Jamestown, North Dakota.  Father, Frederick Augustus Roberts and Mother, Ruby Lenore Roberts.  Around 1920 Roberts moved to California.  A story in the Van Nuys News reports that Floyd Roberts married Miss Edna Vincent after a surprise shower for the couple on 18 September 1925.  In 1924, prior to his marriage, he was already becoming known in auto racing circles.  He raced at the Ascot Speedway in California and participated in a series of races in Hawaii.

1938 Indianapolis 500

In qualifying, Roberts won the pole in his Burd Piston Ring Special, entered by car owner Lou Moore, at a record qualifying speed of 125.681 mph. At that time he had not won a major championship race in his 22-year career. He was quoted as saying, "My luck has always run in cycles. Now it's running good and I'll win."

During the race, Roberts and Wilbur Shaw, in gasoline-powered cars, fell behind several alcohol-fueled machines. When the latter cars had to pit for fuel before the petrol entries, Roberts first took the lead. He made his only pit stop for gas and a tire change at about 300 miles, and relinquished the lead to Jimmy Snyder. 75 miles later, Snyder came in a third time for more methanol, and Roberts, pulling away from Shaw, re-took a lead he would not give up again. He came home with a record average speed of over 117 mph. His share of winnings totaled $38,000. Owner Moore said, "Floyd has always wanted to retire to a farm as soon as he had enough money. I am hoping he will."

1939

At the 1939 Indianapolis 500 Roberts was on lap 106, when the car driven by Bob Swanson lost control and went sideways. Roberts' car struck Swanson's causing Swanson's car to flip over and catch fire ejecting Swanson. Roberts' car went over the outer wall, through a fence and headfirst into a tree. Attempting to avoid the accident, Chet Miller swerved into the debris field. His car flipped, and went into the inner wall. Two spectators were also injured by flying debris. The three drivers were taken to hospitals, while it took over 30 minutes to clear the burning wreck of Swanson's car from the track. Roberts died instantly due to a broken neck, among other injuries. His death was announced before the race was completed.

Indianapolis 500 results

See also
List of fatalities at Indianapolis

References

1900 births
1939 deaths
Champ Car champions
Racing drivers from North Dakota
Racing drivers who died while racing
Indianapolis 500 drivers
Indianapolis 500 polesitters
Indianapolis 500 winners
People from Jamestown, North Dakota
Burials at Oakwood Memorial Park Cemetery
Sports deaths in Indiana
AAA Championship Car drivers